Herbert Fux (25 March 1927 – 13 March 2007) was an Austrian film actor and politician. He appeared in more than 140 films between 1960 and 2007.

Life
Fux was born in Hallein, at the age of five he moved with his family to the city of Salzburg, where his stepfather worked as a board member of the Landestheater. Having passed his matura exams under the circumstances of late World War II in  1944, he studied at the Salzburg Mozarteum University and began a career as a theatre actor.

From the 1960s, Fux appeared on the screen, later also on television, often performing as villain in numerous B movies and crime films but also Spaghetti Westerns and even Bavarian porn films. The huge number of Fux' appearances in about 120 film and 300 TV productions, also under the direction of renowned filmmakers, included a wide range of secondary parts, often distinctive, quirky characters. During his long career, he worked with directors like Michael Anderson, Christian-Jaque, Wolfgang Staudte, Volker Schlöndorff, Franz Antel,Ingmar Bergman, and Werner Herzog as well as with famous actors such as Klaus Kinski, Udo Kier, Vincent Price, and Ulrich Matthes.

Fux died at the age of 79 with the help of the Swiss euthanasia association Dignitas in Zürich, Switzerland.

Politics
In 1977 Fux was among the founders of a citizens' initiative against commercialization and uglification of Salzburg's historic townscape and became an elected member of the city council. In 1982 he and others established the Austrian United Greens party (Vereinte Grüne Österreichs, VGÖ), which in 1986 merged into the Green Alternative (Grüne Alternative). Fux was elected MP of the Austrian National Council in the 1986 legislative election, he retained his seat until December 1988 and again entered into parliament in November 1989. In November 1990 he retired and later served as culture committee chairman in his hometown Salzburg.

Selected filmography

 The Good Soldier Schweik (1960), as Man at Door (uncredited)
 Geständnis einer Sechzehnjährigen (1961)
 The Secret Ways (1961), in a minor role (uncredited)
  (1961), as Dancing bystander (uncredited)
 Mann im Schatten (1961), as Hofleitner
 Jedermann (1961), as Knecht
 The Elusive Corporal (1962), as Surveyor directing two men working with measuring tape (uncredited)
 Der rote Rausch (1962), as Truck Driver
 Adorable Julia (1962), as Inspizient am Theater
 Lulu (1962), as guest at night club (uncredited)
 Waldrausch (1962), as Bauführer Seidl
 Romance in Venice (1962), as Servant at Villa in Venice
 Mariandl's Homecoming (1962), as Policeman
  (1962), as Hahn
 The Black Cobra (1963), as Marco
 Maskenball bei Scotland Yard – Die Geschichte einer unglaublichen Erfindung (1963), as Policeman
 Ist Geraldine ein Engel? (1963)
 Im singenden Rössel am Königssee (1963), as Tankwart (uncredited)
  (1963), as Rocco
  (1964), as Man with sunglasses (uncredited)
 Condemned to Sin (1964) (uncredited)
 Geissel des Fleisches (1965), as Alexander Jablonsky
  (1966), as Secretary of Von Gentz (uncredited)
 Killer's Carnival (1966), as Thug #2 (Vienna segment) (uncredited)
 Liselotte of the Palatinate (1966), as Lorraine's Butler
 The Quiller Memorandum (1966), as Oktober's Man (Man with pipe) (uncredited)
 Das Mädchen mit dem sechsten Sinn (1966), as Jakob, Chauffeur
 Funeral in Berlin (1966), as Artur
  (1967), as Kim
 Death Trip (1967), as Eddie Shapiro
 Hotel Clausewitz (1967), as Dr. Schlack
 Das Kriminalmuseum (1967, TV Series), as Ferry
 Dead Run (1967), as Dr. Harold
 Hot Pavements of Cologne (1967), as Stefan
 The House of 1,000 Dolls (1967), as Abdu
 Operation St. Peter's (1967), as Targout
 Die Verwundbaren (1967)
 Assignment K (1968), as Bavarian Tourist (uncredited)
 Beyond the Law (1968), as Eustaccio / Denholm
 The Long Day of Inspector Blomfield (1968), as Blincky Smith
 69 Liebesspiele (1968), as Gover
 Anzio (1968), as Officer on Phone (uncredited)
  (1968), as Felix
 The Gorilla of Soho (1968), as Mr. Sugar
 Three-Cornered Bed (1969), as Seaman
 Dead Body on Broadway (1969), as Butler Robin
 Kommissar X – Drei goldene Schlangen (1969), as Fingers, Killer #1
 Hate Is My God (1969), as Killer
 The Castle of Fu Manchu (1969), as Governor (uncredited)
 Die Neffen des Herrn General (1969), as Butler
 Köpfchen in das Wasser, Schwänzchen in die Höh (1969)
 Champagner für Zimmer 17 (1969), as Dr. Edmund Caspari
 Angels of the Street (1969), as Holleck
  (1969), as Lord Kaputt
 Revenge (1969), as Killer
 Eugenie… The Story of Her Journey into Perversion (1970), as Hardin (uncredited)
 Mark of the Devil (1970), as Jeff Wilkens - Executioner
 Schwarzer Nerz auf zarter Haut (1970), as Dr. Dahl
 Hänsel und Gretel verliefen sich im Wald (1970), as Knecht
 Gentlemen in White Vests (1970), as Luigi Pinelli
 Love, Vampire Style (1970), as Engelmann
 Strogoff (1970), as Pope (uncredited)
 Ritter Orgas muß mal wieder (1970), as Ritter Orgas
 Das haut den stärksten Zwilling um (1971), as Herbert
 Aunt Trude from Buxtehude (1971), as Harry, der Hoteldieb
 Einer spinnt immer (1971), as Ganove
 Ore di terrore / Kreuzfahrt des Grauens (1971), as Prof. Martin
 Kreuzfahrt des Grauens (1971), as Martin
 Lady Frankenstein (1971), as Tom
  (1971, TV miniseries), as Smith
 The Young Seducers 2 (1972), as Macky, the murderer at the beach
 Sonny and Jed (1972), as Merril
  (1972), as Lawrientieff
 Trouble with Trixie (1972), as Polizist
 Le Sex Shop (1972), as M. Henri
 Escape to the Sun (1972)
 Night Flight from Moscow (1973), as Gardener
 Little Funny Guy (1973)
 Pan (1973)
 Abenteuer eines Sommers (1973)
 Der Teufel in Miss Jonas (1974), as the Devil
 Undine 74 (1974), as Hotelangestellter
 Der kleine Doktor (1974, TV Series), as Louis
 The Odessa File (1974), as Make-up man (uncredited)
 Auf ins blaukarierte Himmelbett (1974), as Briefträger
 Pogled iz potkrovlija (1974), as Mr. Miller
 Trinity Plus the Clown and a Guitar (1975), as Leader of the Badmen
 Der Kumpel läßt das Jucken nicht (1975), as Pimp
 The Lost Honour of Katharina Blum (1975), as Weninger
  (1975)
 Josefine Mutzenbacher – Wie sie wirklich war: 1. Teil (1976), as Herr Rudolf (voice, uncredited)
 Jack the Ripper (1976), as Charlie, the Fisherman
  (1976)
 21 Hours at Munich (1976, TV Movie), as Shorr
 Rosemary's Daughter (1976), as Vokurka
  (1977), as Menzel
 Love Letters of a Portuguese Nun (1977), as Satan
 Lady Dracula (1977) (uncredited)
 Women in Hospital (1977)
 The Expulsion from Paradise (1977), as Cinematographer
 Three Swedes in Upper Bavaria (1977), as Pfarrer
 The Serpent's Egg (1977) (uncredited)
 Ein echter Wiener geht nicht unter (1977, TV Series), as Policeman
 Die Beichte der Josefine Mutzenbacher (1978), as Wirt (voice, uncredited)
 The Uranium Conspiracy (1978), as Ulrich
 Popcorn and Ice Cream (1978), as Priest
 Zwei Däninnen in Lederhosen (1979), as Calafati
 Goetz von Berlichingen of the Iron Hand (1979), as Bauer Sievers
 Himmel, Scheich und Wolkenbruch (1979), as Number One
 Son of Hitler (1979), as Older Tramp
 Missile X – Geheimauftrag Neutronenbombe (1979)
 Cola, Candy, Chocolate (1979), as Pfarrer Herbert
 Woyzeck (1979), as Unteroffizier
 Zwei tolle Käfer räumen auf (1979)
 Austern mit Senf (1979)
  (1980)
 Zärtlich, aber frech wie Oskar (1980), as Pfarrer
 Auf Achse (1980, TV Series), as Schani
 Egon Schiele – Exzess und Bestrafung (1980), as Gendarm
  (1981, TV film), as Stroffer
 Der Bockerer (1981)
 Dantons Tod (1981, TV film)
 The Mysterious Stranger (1982, TV Movie), as Hans Katzenyammer
 Ein dicker Hund (1982), as Dr. Uhu
 Die unglaublichen Abenteuer des Guru Jakob (1983), as Wedel
 Plem, Plem – Die Schule brennt (1983), as Siegfried
 Happy Weekend (1983)
  (1984), as Kroske
 Big Mäc (1985), as Franz Leitner
  (1987), as Dosser
 Bavaria Blue (1990), as Edi Blecha
  (1991), as Gerichtsvollzieher
 Der Bergdoktor (1992–1998, TV Series), as Mr. Konrad
 Kaisermühlen Blues (1992-2000, TV Series), as Sebesta / Funktionär Sebesta
 Night on Fire (1992), as Eschmann
 Familie Heinz Becker (1993, TV Series), as Taxifahrer
 The Three Musketeers (1993), as Innkeeper
 Großstadtrevier (1994, TV Series), as Knorke
 Du bringst mich noch um (1994), as Playwright
 Stockinger (1996–1997, TV Series), as Michael Fuchs
 Black Flamingos – Sie lieben euch zu Tode (1998)
 Asterix & Obelix Take On Caesar (1999), as Ticketdebus
 Professor Niedlich (2001), as Professor Niedlich
  (2002), as Alm-Öhi
 Silentium (2004), as Taxi driver
 SOKO Kitzbühel (2005, TV Series), as Max Seidel
 Pfarrer Braun (2005, TV Series), as Pater Pankraz
 Agathe kann's nicht lassen (2005, TV Series)
 SOKO Donau (2005, TV Series), as Dolezal
 Vineta (2006), as Fritz Feldmann-See
 Zapping-Alien@Mozart-Balls (2009), as Archbishop

References

External links

1927 births
2007 deaths
Austrian male film actors
Austrian male television actors
20th-century Austrian male actors
21st-century Austrian male actors
People from Hallein
Deaths by euthanasia